Ovarian stimulation may refer to:
Ovulation induction, reversing anovulation or oligoovulation
Final maturation induction of oocytes
Controlled ovarian hyperstimulation, stimulating the development of multiple follicles of the ovaries in one single cycle
Physiologic hormonal stimulation of folliculogenesis